Cold Moon is a 1991 French drama film directed by Patrick Bouchitey. It was entered into the 1991 Cannes Film Festival. It is based on the Charles Bukowski short stories "The Copulating Mermaid of Venice" and "Trouble with the Battery".

Cast
 Jean-François Stévenin as Simon
 Patrick Bouchitey as Dédé
 Jean-Pierre Bisson as Gérard, le beau-frère de Dédé
 Jackie Berroyer as The monk
 Consuelo De Haviland as La blonde / Blonde girl
 Laura Favali as Nadine, la soeur de Dédé
 Jean-Pierre Castaldi as Félix
 Silvana de Faria as La prostituée / Whore
 Karine Nuris as La sirène
 Roland Blanche as L'accoudé
 Dominique Maurin as Le vagabond (as Dominique Collignon Maurin)
 Bernard Crombey as Le boucher
 Patrick Fierry as Jean-Loup
 Anne Macina as La femme de la voiture
 Marie Mergey as Suzanne, la tante de Simon / Aunt Suzanne

References

External links

1991 films
1991 drama films
French drama films
1990s French-language films
Films based on works by Charles Bukowski
Films directed by Patrick Bouchitey
French black-and-white films
Films produced by Luc Besson
Films based on short fiction
Films based on multiple works
1990s French films